Z8 or Z-8 or variation, may refer to:

Computing and electronics
 Motorola RIZR Z8, a smartphone
 Zilog Z8, a microprocessor
 .z8, a Z-machine interpreter file extension

Places
 Ofu Airport (FAA airport code Z08), Ofu, American Samoa
 Ōtemachi Station (Tokyo) (station code Z08), Chiyoda, Tokyo, Japan
 Telescope Live (observatory code Z08), Oria, Spain; see List of observatory codes

Vehicles
 BMW Z8, an automobile
 Changhe Z-8, a Chinese transport helicopter, license produced Aérospatiale Super Frelon
 Zotye Z8, a crossover automobile

Other uses
 Línea Aérea Amaszonas (IATA airline code Z8)
 Z08, a fictional character from Young Justice; see List of Young Justice characters
 Saxo-rama (album code Z-08), an album by Elie Apper

See also